Guy Colwell (born March 28, 1945) is an American painter and occasional underground cartoonist. Although not African-American himself, Colwell's comics often portray blacks in strong roles in stories of life on the streets. His "Figurative Social Surrealist" paintings reflect on the human condition, economic inequality, injustice, and alienation from the natural world.

Biography 
Guy Colwell was on born March 28, 1945, in Oakland, California. Colwell studied art at the California College of Arts and Crafts (now California College of the Arts). After completing two years there, he dropped out to travel and get some life and work experience.

When he had worked an almost two-year stint as a sculptor for Mattel, and was preparing his return to college. He was arrested for draft refusal and sentenced to two years in federal prison at McNeil Island Corrections Center, in Washington state. His experiences there and the period after his release were the genesis of his underground comix series Inner City Romance, published by Last Gasp beginning in 1972. He was financially unable to continue art school as planned but deeply committed to painting as his life work, so was mainly self-taught thereafter.

During the turbulent 1970s scene in San Francisco, Colwell worked as an illustrator for the underground paper Good Times and joined the commune that produced this weekly.

Colwell left the Good Times after the paper ceased publication and concentrated on doing paintings and a few comic books until the mid-1980s. After this creative period marred by drug abuse, Colwell worked for Rip Off Press as a colorist, also contributing stories, artwork, or production to many underground comic book titles and anthologies. He authored a second comic book series under the title Doll and completely stopped using drugs and alcohol while working at Rip Off Press.

In 1986, upon hearing of The Great Peace March for Global Nuclear Disarmament, Colwell took an 18-month leave of absence from Rip Off Press to join what was touted by original Great Peace March organizer David Mixner as a major event in American history. While on the GPM, Colwell helped draw route maps for the marchers as well as creating art depicting marchers in their everyday lives. His route maps and drawings are part of the Swarthmore College Peace Collection.

On returning to Rip Off Press, by 1988 relocated to Auburn, California, Colwell became strongly influenced by the great natural beauty and wildlife of the Sierra Mountains. Nature and animal subject matter would thereafter become much more prominent in his work and inspired a deeper exploration of surrealism. Travels throughout Europe on foot with a backpack, and several trips to Africa, have deepened this aspect of the pictures he produces. His artwork today is internationally recognized for powerful social commentary. The sometimes uncomfortable images he renders with sharp clarity reminiscent of Renaissance master works have received praise from art critics, and have been sought after by collectors who are looking for something more than pleasant wall decorations.

His 2004 painting, The Abuse, is his depiction of the prisoner abuse at Abu Ghraib prison in Iraq. This being Colwell's most controversial work, Lori Haigh, the owner of the San Francisco gallery where it was exhibited received death threats and was physically attacked. Her gallery also received damage from unknown persons, causing it to close permanently.

Examples of Colwell's original works can be seen at the Crocker Art Museum in Sacramento, California, and the Pritikin Museum in San Francisco, which features his magnum opus, Litter Beach. In September 2012, Colwell's work was featured in Juxtapoz magazine. New small works and comic page originals can be seen on the Heritage Auctions website as well as Colwell's own site.

Personal life 
Colwell is married and lives in Berkeley, California, where he devotes himself to creating personal and political art.

Bibliography 
 Inner City Romance (Last Gasp, 5-issue series, 1972–1978)
 Doll (Rip Off Press, 8-issue series, 1989–1992)
 The Further Adventures of Doll (Kitchen Sink Press, 1989)
 Central Body: The Art of Guy Colwell (Rip Off Press, 1991) — collection of his art between the years 1964-1991
 In Fox's Forest (Fantagraphics, 2016)

References

Further reading 
 Sherman, Bill. "Colwell's Mean Street Comix," The Comics Journal #43 (Dec. 1978), pp. 70–71
 "Guy Colwell Exhibits at Auburn Arts Center," The Comics Journal #130 (July 1989), pp. 29–30 
 Seneca, Matt.  "Street Talk: The Guy Colwell Interview," The Comics Journal (Apr. 30, 2015).

External links 
 
 Colwell's Abuse painting

20th-century American painters
American male painters
21st-century American painters
American anti–Iraq War activists
American anti–nuclear weapons activists
Artists from Berkeley, California
Artists from Oakland, California
Underground cartoonists
Living people
1945 births
People from Auburn, California
Activists from California